Belief or Nonbelief? (originally published in Italian as In cosa crede chi non crede?) is a 1996 non-fiction book by Umberto Eco and Cardinal Carlo Maria Martini. The book was first published on January 12, 2000 through Arcade Publishing and consists of a dialogue between Eco and Martini about the subject of religion.

The book was named one of the Los Angeles Times' "Best Nonfiction Of 2000".

Synopsis
Belief or Nonbelief? has eight chapters, during which Eco and Cardinal Martini discuss various topics such as religion, belief, abortion, and ethics. The book's title refers to "the beliefs of those who do not believe in God or religious dogmas".

Reception
Critical reception for the book was mostly positive. The Los Angeles Times and the Dallas Morning News both gave positive reviews for Belief or Nonbelief?, with the Los Angeles Times calling it a "short but challenging book".

References

1996 non-fiction books
Books about religion
Arcade Publishing books